Music for Symphony and Jazz Band is an album by the trumpeter/flugelhornist and composer Franco Ambrosetti which was recorded in 1990 and released on the Enja label the following year.

Reception

The Allmusic review by Scott Yanow stated "This CD is a classic, one of the all-time best examples of third stream music (a combination of jazz and classical music)".

Track listing
 "C Jam Blues" (Duke Ellington) – 5:34
 "Night and Day" (Cole Porter) – 6:13
 "The Grave" (Daniel Schnyder) – 6:03
 "Well, You Needn't" (Thelonious Monk) – 7:03
 "Peace" (Horace Silver) – 4:03
 "The Night Has a Thousand Eyes" (Jerry Brainin, Buddy Bernier) – 6:27
 "Close Encounter" (Franco Ambrosetti) – 4:51
 "Inside the Dome" (Schnyder) – 6:31
 "Manteca" (Dizzy Gillespie) – 4:17

Personnel
Franco Ambrosetti – trumpet, flugelhorn
Daniel Schnyder – soprano saxophone
Greg Osby – alto saxophone
Wladshaw Sendecki – piano, arranger
Simon Nabatov – piano (tracks 2, 4 & 8)
Ed Schuller – bass
Alfredo Golina – drums
NDR Symphony Orchestra directed by Dieter Glawischnig

References

Franco Ambrosetti albums
1991 albums
Enja Records albums